218TV is a Libyan free-to-air satellite channel founded in 2015 in Amman, Jordan. The channel provides several news broadcasts along with various social and entertainment shows.

History
The channel was founded on 6 August 2015 by the Libyan Women's rights activist Huda El-Sarari and her husband Mujahid Bosifi, a former anti-Gaddafi activist who lived in the Netherlands.

In late 2017, sister channel 218 News was launched.

218TV was said to be the most popular in Libya in 2019 when Huda El-Sarari was recognised for her influence in the Arab world in 2019 by "Arabian Business" magazine.

Programming
 US-L: weekly program focusing on Libya–United States relations
 Interview: weekly program
 Amazighi in Arabic: weekly program focusing on Berber culture in Libya
 Subh (The Morning): daily morning program
 Ashia (The Evening): daily entertainment program
 Game: weekly sports show
 Sponda
 Up To Tech

Frequency
 Nilesat V 12398
 27.500 FEC 5/6

References

Television stations in Libya